Zarechye is a rural locality (a village) in Nyuksenskoye Rural Settlement, Nyuksensky District, Vologda Oblast, Russia. The population was 27 as of 2002.

Geography 
Zarechye is located 61 km northeast of Nyuksenitsa (the district's administrative centre) by road. Bobrovskoye is the nearest rural locality.

References 

Rural localities in Nyuksensky District